Arenigobius is a genus of gobies native to the Indian Ocean and the western Pacific Ocean.

Species
There are currently three recognized species in this genus:
 Arenigobius bifrenatus (Kner, 1865) (bridled goby)
 Arenigobius frenatus (Günther, 1861) (half-bridled goby)
 Arenigobius leftwichi (J. D. Ogilby, 1910) (oyster goby)

References

 
Gobiidae